

Introduction
Plymouth, Pennsylvania sits on the west side of Pennsylvania's Wyoming Valley, wedged between the Susquehanna River and the Shawnee Mountain range. Just below the mountain are hills that surround the town and form a natural amphitheater that separates the town from the rest of the valley. Below the hills, the flat lands are formed in the shape of a frying pan, the pan being the Shawnee flats, once the center of the town's agricultural activities, and the handle being a spit of narrow land extending east from the flats, where the center of town is located. 

At the beginning of the 19th century, Plymouth's primary industry was agriculture, and many of its residents were the descendants of the Connecticut Yankees who first settled the town. Its early architecture resembled that of a small New England village. However, vast anthracite coal beds lay below the surface at various depths, and by the 1850s, coal mining was the town's primary occupation, attracting a more diverse population. After the arrival of the railroad in 1857, the town's architecture became more typical of a growing industrial center.

Notable buildings (1780–1860)

Notable buildings (1861–1880)

Notable buildings (1881–1900)

Notable buildings (1901–1930)

Notable buildings (1931–2022)

Coal breakers below Academy Street

Coal breakers above Academy Street

See also
History of Plymouth, Pennsylvania
Coal mining in Plymouth, Pennsylvania
Pennamite–Yankee War
Plymouth, Pennsylvania

References

External links

Plymouth